Javian Hawkins is an American football running back for the Saskatchewan Roughriders of the Canadian Football League (CFL). He played college football for the Louisville Cardinals. He opted out of the remainder of the season in November 2020 and entered the 2021 NFL Draft.

Early years
Hawkins originally attended Astronaut High School in Titusville, Florida, before transferring to Cocoa High School in Cocoa, Florida. During his high school career he rushed for over 4,000 yards and 40 touchdowns. Hawkins committed to the University of Louisville to play college football.

College career
Hawkins played in three games his first year at Louisville in 2018 and took a redshirt. As a redshirt freshman in 2019, he broke the school record for rushing yards by a running back in a season with 1,525 on 264 carries and nine touchdowns. Hawkins returned as Louisville's starting running back in 2020. Hawkins opted out of the remainder of the 2020 season prior to the November 21 game against Syracuse. In addition, he decided to forgo his remaining two years of eligibility and enter the 2021 NFL Draft.

Professional career

Atlanta Falcons
Hawkins signed with the Atlanta Falcons as an undrafted free agent on May 3, 2021. On August 24, the Falcons released Hawkins.

Tennessee Titans
On August 26, 2021, Hawkins signed with the Tennessee Titans. He was waived on August 31, 2021.

Los Angeles Rams
On September 20, 2021, Hawkins signed with the Los Angeles Rams practice squad. Hawkins won Super Bowl LVI when the Rams defeated the Cincinnati Bengals. 

On February 15, 2022, Hawkins signed a reserve/future contract with the Rams. He was waived on May 4, 2022.

Saskatchewan Roughriders

On November 10, 2022, Hawkins was signed by the Saskatchewan Roughriders.

References

External links
Louisville Cardinals bio

1999 births
Living people
People from Titusville, Florida
Players of American football from Florida
American football running backs
Louisville Cardinals football players
Atlanta Falcons players
Tennessee Titans players
Los Angeles Rams players